The Forests Sing Forever (German: Und ewig singen die Wälder) is a 1959 Austrian drama film directed by Paul May and starring Gert Fröbe, Hansjörg Felmy and Joachim Hansen. It was followed by a 1960 sequel The Inheritance of Bjorndal.

The film's sets were designed by the art director Leo Metzenbauer, and it was filmed at the Bjølstad Farm.

Cast
Gert Fröbe as Dag sen.
Hansjörg Felmy as Tore
Joachim Hansen as young Dag
Carl Lange as Mr. von Gall
Anna Smolik as Elisabeth von Gall
Hans Nielsen as Major Barre
Maj-Britt Nilsson as Adelheid
Elisabeth Epp as Jungfer Kruse
Jürgen Goslar as Lt. Margas
Hanns Ernst Jäger as Der Hoveländer
Hilde Schreiber as Seine Tochter Borghild
Fritz Hinz-Fabricius as Pfarrer Ramer
Franz Schafheitlin as Kaufmann Holder - Schwager des alten Dag
Peter Schmidberger as Jörn Vielfalt of Björndal

References

External links

1950s historical drama films
Austrian historical drama films
Films directed by Paul May
Films based on Norwegian novels
Films set in Norway
Films set in the 19th century
Films set in forests
1959 drama films
1950s German-language films